Phnom Penh Crown Football Club (PPCFC;) is a Cambodian professional football club based in Sangkat Toul Sangke II, Khan Russey Keo, Phnom Penh, competing in the Cambodian Premier League. It was established as Samart United FC in 2001 and subsequently changed its name to Hello United FC (2005), Phnom Penh United FC (2006), Phnom Penh Empire FC (2007), and  Phnom Penh Crown FC (2009).

Players

Record

Continental

Domestic
 
Cambodian Premier League
Champions (8): 2002 (as "Samart United"), 2008 (as "Phnom Penh Empire"), 2010, 2011, 2014, 2015, 2021, 2022

Hun Sen Cup
Champions (2): 2008 (as "Phnom Penh Empire"), 2009

Cambodian Super Cup
Champions (1): 2022

Cambodian League Cup
Champions (1): 2022

Club staff

Head coaches
Coaches by years

Captains
Captain by years

References

 
Association football clubs established in 2001
2001 establishments in Cambodia